Dow is an unincorporated community in Jersey County, Illinois, United States.

History
Dow was laid out in 1883 when the railroad was extended to that point. The community derives its name from its founder, John McDow.

Education
Dow was served by the public K-12 Jersey Community Unit School District 100. District schools in Dow included the Dow Elementary School. The school was closed in June 2011 due to district realignment.

References

Unincorporated communities in Illinois
Unincorporated communities in Jersey County, Illinois